Gabrielle may refer to:
 Gabrielle (given name), a French female given name derived from Gabriel

Film and television
 Gabrielle (1954 film), a Swedish film directed by Hasse Ekman
 Gabrielle (2005 film), a French film directed by Patrice Chéreau
 Gabrielle (2013 film), a Canadian film directed by Louise Archambault
 Gabrielle (Xena: Warrior Princess), a character in the television series Xena: Warrior Princess
 Gabrielle (TV series), a daytime talk show

Music
 Gabrielle (singer) (born 1969), English singer
 Gabrielle (album), her self-titled second album
 "Gabrielle", song by Hootenanny Singers, 1964
 "Gabrielle" (Johnny Hallyday song), 1976
 Gabrielle Leithaug (born 1985), Norwegian X Factor contestant and singer known as Gabrielle
 "Gabrielle", a 1980 single by The Nips
 "Gabrielle", a 2020 single by Brett Eldredge
 "Gabrielle", a song from the album Nymphetamine by Cradle of Filth
 "Gabrielle", a song from the album Love Me for a Reason by The Osmonds
 "Gabrielle", a song from the album Shinola, Vol. 1 by Ween

Others
 Tropical Storm Gabrielle (disambiguation)
 Gabrielle, a temporary nickname for Dysnomia, the moon of the dwarf planet Eris
 Gabrielle, an 1849 play by Émile Augier

See also
 Gabriel (disambiguation)
 Gabriele, a given name and surname